Kenneth Sully (born 28 November 1950) is a Canadian diver. He competed at the 1968 Summer Olympics and the 1972 Summer Olympics.

References

External links
 

1950 births
Living people
Canadian male divers
Olympic divers of Canada
Divers at the 1968 Summer Olympics
Divers at the 1972 Summer Olympics
Sportspeople from New Westminster
Commonwealth Games medallists in diving
Commonwealth Games silver medallists for Canada
Divers at the 1970 British Commonwealth Games
Pan American Games competitors for Canada
Divers at the 1971 Pan American Games
Medallists at the 1970 British Commonwealth Games